The giant whiptail (Aspidoscelis motaguae) is a species of teiid lizard native to Mexico, Guatemala, El Salvador, Honduras, and Nicaragua. It has also been introduced to Florida in the United States where it is considered an invasive species.

References

Reptiles described in 1941
Taxa named by J. Townsend Sackett